The Capitoline Wolf suckling the twins Romulus and Remus is a symbol of Rome, Italy. The statue was favoured by Italian dictator Benito Mussolini, who donated copies of the statues to various places around the world.

Below is a list of replicas of the Capitoline Wolf statue in different places of the world:

Argentina
Buenos Aires - in the Botanic Gardens and Parque Lezama.This reproduction was donated by Vittorio Emmanuelle III, King of Italy (1869-1947) to the Ambassador of the Argentine Republic, Dr. Roque Sáenz Peña, on the occasion of the Centenary of the May Revolution, in 1910.
Bariloche
Mendoza - in the Plaza de Italia
San Martín, Mendoza - in the Plaza Italia
Mar de Plata

Australia
Perth - in the lobby of the WA Italian Club, on Fitzgerald Street.

Belgium
La Louvière - on the Place de la Louve

Bolivia
La Paz - on the Plaza Roma, Obrajes.

Brazil
Brasília - in front of the "Palácio do Buriti", the seat of the government of the Federal District, donated by the mayor of Rome at the time of the foundation of Brasília

Canada
Toronto - in the collection of the City of Toronto
Thunder Bay - located in the Thunder Bay Soroptimist International Friendship Garden Italian Monument

Chile
Talca - in Plaza Italia (on the crossing of Calle 11 Oriente and Calle 2 Sur), 1942. Stolen in 2010, replaced with a replica by 2013.
Valparaiso - in Parque Italia, 1936.
Santiago

China
Changchun - in school of history and culture, Northeast Normal University,given to the Changchun children's park by Mussolini in 1938 when the city(then named Xinjing) was the capital of Manchukuo.On April 27, 1952, Zhu Huan was passing through the "Datong Park" in Changchun City and found that the stone seat of the female wolf statue was in ruins. This was a gift from the Italian fascist government as a national gift to Xinjing City in Manchukuo during the Manchukuo period . He found the bronze female wolf statue nearby and escorted the female wolf statue to the office building of the History Department of Northeastern University on Liberty Avenue.

France
Paris - in place Paul Painlevé
Narbonne

Guatemala
Guatemala City - in front of the city hall in the civic center

Hungary
Szarvas - in front of the Bolza castle.

Italy
Rome - the original statue is in the Capitoline Museums and a copy on a pillar at the northern corner of Palazzo senatorio
Pisa - on the Piazza dei Miracoli
Siena - several sites in the city, including the Duomo
Aquileia - in the Piazza Capitolio, next to the basilica
Piacenza - at the beginning of via Emilia
 Reggio Emilia - in the Piazza del Popolo
 Massa Lombarda - inserted into a monument to the fallen of all wars at the entrance of the town cemetery
 Verona - inserted into a monument to the fallen of all wars in the old town walls

Japan

Chōfu, Tokyo - in Ajinomoto Stadium, donated from the Commune of Rome in 2001.
Chiyoda, Tokyo - in Hibiya Park, one block south of the Imperial Palace complex. It was donated by Benito Mussolini in 1938.

Libya

Benghazi - Benghazi Corniche Columns, or Romulus Benghazi.

Moldova
Chișinău - Statue of Capitoline Wolf, Chișinău in front of National Museum of History

New Zealand
Hamilton - At the Italian Renaissance Garden entranceway in the Hamilton Gardens

Norway
Tønsberg, Vestfold

Romania
Romanian Capitoline Wolf statues (Lupoaica):
Alba Iulia - Capitoline Wolf statue in a park
Blaj - Capitoline Wolf statue in the center
Brad - Capitoline Wolf statue in the center, near the Dacian Standard

Brașov - Capitoline Wolf statue in front of the City Hall
Bucharest - Capitoline Wolf statue on the Brătianu Boulevard
Cluj-Napoca - Capitoline Wolf Statue, Cluj-Napoca
Constanța - Capitoline Wolf statue in the historical downtown
Cristeștii Ciceului
Dej
Galați - Capitoline Wolf statue in a park
Iernut - Capitoline Wolf statue in the center
Leșu
Luduș
Maieru
Năsăud
Orăștie
Reghin
Săcele
Satu Mare - Capitoline Wolf statue in the "Vasile Lucaciu" Park
Sighișoara - Capitoline Wolf statue in the Oberth Square (Piața Oberth)
Târgu Mureș - Capitoline Wolf statue in the Prefecture Square (Piața Prefecturii)
Târnăveni
Timișoara - Capitoline Wolf statue in front of the Orthodox Cathedral
Toplița
Turda - Capitoline Wolf statue in the center
Zalău - Capitoline Wolf statue in the central park

Spain

Segovia: There is a Capitoline Wolf statue under the Roman aqueduct in Segovia
Mérida: The Capitoline Wolf is near the Roman bridge of the city.
Tarragona : There is a Capitoline wolf located inside the museum named Circ Romà

Sweden
Millesgården, Lidingö

Switzerland 
Fribourg - In front of the Miséricorde Building of the University of Fribourg

Tajikistan 
Shahriston - There is a Capitoline Wolf statue near Istaravšan, Soghd, which memorializes a wolf drawing found in the region.

United Kingdom 
Wells, Somerset - beside the A39 a little north of the city. Sculpted by an Italian prisoner-of-war in World War II.

United States

Chicago, Illinois - Located in the Ogden Avenue
Boston, Massachusetts - interior entrance to Boston Latin School 
Cincinnati, Ohio - Capitoline Wolf Statue, Cincinnati 
Cleveland, Ohio
Del Rio, Texas - Located at the Brinkley Circle, home of Dr. John Romulus Brinkley
New York City, New York - Located in the Riverdale neighborhood of The Bronx on the grounds of the Hebrew Home for the Aged
Rome, Georgia - at the entrance to the Rome City Auditorium
Rome, New York- Located at The Beeches Conference Center and Restaurant
Sault Ste. Marie, Michigan - located in front of the Chippewa County courthouse
Tulsa, Oklahoma - in the gardens of the Philbrook Museum
Washington, DC - on the ground floor of the National Gallery of Art

Uruguay
 Montevideo - on the crossing of Bulevar Artigas and Av. 8 de Octubre
 Florida
 Punta del Este - on the crossing of Avenida Italia and Av. Petragosa Sierra

Gallery

References

See also

Sculptures of classical mythology
She-wolf (Roman mythology)
Statues by subject
Lists of statues
Wolves in art
Cultural depictions of Romulus and Remus
Capitoline Wolf statues